Düsseldorf-Rath is a railway station situated at Rath, Düsseldorf in western Germany. It is served by the S6 line of Rhine-Ruhr S-Bahn. It is also served by line U71 of the Düsseldorf Stadtbahn and Tram line 701.

References 

Railway stations in Düsseldorf
S6 (Rhine-Ruhr S-Bahn)
Rhine-Ruhr S-Bahn stations
Railway stations in Germany opened in 1874